Lou Holtz may refer to:
 Lou Holtz (born 1937), American football coach
 His son, Lou Jr. (born 1964), also an American football coach, better known as Skip Holtz
 His grandson, Lou III (born 1994), an American football player and coach, better known as Trey Holtz
 Lou Holtz (actor) (1893–1980), an American vaudevillian, comic actor, and theatrical producer
His son, Lou Jr., an American screenwriter of The Cable Guy (1996)